ABBA ABBA is the 22nd novel by English author Anthony Burgess, published in 1977. It consists of two parts: the first is about the last months in the life of John Keats and his encounters with the Roman (dialectal) poet Giuseppe Gioacchino Belli. The second presents English translation of a sequence of blasphemous sonnets by Belli.

The title refers to the enclosed rhyme scheme, commonly used by both Keats and Belli; it can also refer to Christ's prayer in the garden of Gethsemane, prior to his agony ("Abba" means "father"). It is the epitaph on Burgess's marble memorial stone, behind which the vessel with his remains is kept, in Monte Carlo. 'AB' are also Anthony Burgess' initials.

Synopsis

In Part One, Keats has various adventures, meeting Belli in the Sistine Chapel and Pauline Bonaparte, sister of Napoleon, in the Pincio, and a Roman man of letters named Giovanni Gulielmi.

Part Two consists of about seventy (from a total of 2,279) amusingly blasphemous sonnets by Belli, purportedly translated by one Joseph Joachim Wilson, a descendant of Gulielmi. An elaborate passage describes how the Italian Gulielmis were transformed into English Wilsons "during a wave of anti-Italian feeling occasioned by alleged ice-cream poisoning in the 1890s in the Lancashire coastal resorts of Blackpool, Cleveleys, Bispham and Fleetwood".

Authorship

Belli was a real person but Giovanni Gulielmi and his descendant Joseph Joachim Wilson are fictional. Wilson's name is a thinly veiled allusion to Burgess's real name, John Anthony Burgess Wilson, but the Belli translations are in fact by Burgess's Italian wife, Liana Burgess.

Characters
John Keats – the poet
Giuseppe Gioacchino Belli – the Roman dialectal poet 
Pauline Bonaparte – Napoleon's sister

References

Novels by Anthony Burgess
1977 British novels
Novels about writers
Novels set in Italy
Sonnet studies
Faber and Faber books